Community of True Inspiration Residence, also known as the Lower Ebenezer Society house and West Seneca Historical Society, is a historic home located at West Seneca in Erie County, New York. It was built about 1850, and is a -story, vernacular wood-frame building with a gable roof. A rear wing was added in the 1870s, with additions made in 1956. It was moved to its present site in 1956, when donated to the West Seneca Historical Society.  It is one of the few remaining buildings in the Ebenezer section of West Seneca built by the Community of True Inspiration who settled in the area in the 1840s.

It was listed on the National Register of Historic Places in 2013.

References

External links
Official Website of the Town of West Seneca

Amana Colonies
Historic house museums in New York (state)
Clubhouses on the National Register of Historic Places in New York (state)
Houses completed in 1936
Museums in Erie County, New York
National Register of Historic Places in Erie County, New York